Tashtagolsky (masculine), Tashtagolskaya (feminine), or Tashtagolskoye (neuter) may refer to:
Tashtagolsky District, a district of Kemerovo Oblast, Russia
Tashtagolskoye Urban Settlement, a municipal formation within Tashtagolsky Municipal District which Tashtagol Town Under Oblast Jurisdiction in Kemerovo Oblast, Russia is incorporated as